Rudyard is an unincorporated community and census-designated place (CDP) in Hill County, Montana, United States. The population was 258 at the 2010 census.

The community was established as a switching station on the Great Northern Railway. The post office opened in 1910. It is named after author Rudyard Kipling.

Geography
Rudyard is located western Hill County at  (48.560633, -110.554737). U.S. Route 2 runs along the southern edge of the community, leading east  to Havre, the county seat, and west  to Shelby.

Antipodes
Rudyard has the distinction of being the only community in the contiguous United States that sits atop a non-oceanic antipode, that being one of the Kerguelen Islands.

Demographics

As of the census of 2000, there were 275 people, 126 households, and 71 families residing in the CDP. The population density was 295.8 people per square mile (114.2/km). There were 155 housing units at an average density of 166.7 per square mile (64.4/km). The racial makeup of the CDP was 98.18% White, 0.73% Native American, and 1.09% from two or more races. Hispanic or Latino of any race were 0.36% of the population.

There were 126 households, out of which 27.0% had children under the age of 18 living with them, 45.2% were married couples living together, 7.1% had a female householder with no husband present, and 42.9% were non-families. 38.9% of all households were made up of individuals, and 20.6% had someone living alone who was 65 years of age or older. The average household size was 2.18 and the average family size was 2.94.

In the CDP, the population was spread out, with 25.8% under the age of 18, 2.9% from 18 to 24, 25.5% from 25 to 44, 26.2% from 45 to 64, and 19.6% who were 65 years of age or older. The median age was 43 years. For every 100 females, there were 100.7 males. For every 100 females age 18 and over, there were 94.3 males.

The median income for a household in the CDP was $28,393, and the median income for a family was $34,844. Males had a median income of $25,694 versus $15,833 for females. The per capita income for the CDP was $16,889. About 7.2% of families and 9.9% of the population were below the poverty line, including 12.9% of those under the age of 18 and none of those 65 or over.

Education
North Star High School and middle school are located in Rudyard. They are known as the Knights. North Star Elementary school is located in Gildford.

References

Census-designated places in Hill County, Montana
Census-designated places in Montana